Jonas Larsen (born 11 March 1992) is a Danish Paralympic swimmer. He represented Denmark at the 2012 Summer Paralympics and at the 2016 Summer Paralympics and he won the bronze medal in the men's 150 metre individual medley SM4 event in 2016.

At the 2013 World Championships held in Montreal, Quebec, Canada, he won the bronze medal in the men's 150 metre medley SM4 event.

At the 2014 European Championships held in Eindhoven, Netherlands, he won the gold medal in the men's 150 metre individual medley SM4 event. Two years later, at the 2016 European Championships held in Funchal, Madeira, he won two medals: the silver medal in the men's 150 metre individual medley SM4 event and the bronze medal in the men's 50 metre backstroke S5 event.

References

External links 
 

1992 births
Living people
Place of birth missing (living people)
Danish male backstroke swimmers
Danish male medley swimmers
Paralympic swimmers of Denmark
Paralympic bronze medalists for Denmark
Paralympic medalists in swimming
Swimmers at the 2012 Summer Paralympics
Swimmers at the 2016 Summer Paralympics
Medalists at the 2016 Summer Paralympics
Medalists at the World Para Swimming Championships
Medalists at the World Para Swimming European Championships
S5-classified Paralympic swimmers